Ken Maddison is an Australian former rugby league footballer who played in the 1960s and 1970s. He played in the New South Wales Rugby Football League premiership for the St. George Dragons (with whom he won the 1966 premiership) and later the Cronulla-Sutherland Sharks (whom he captained). He was also a state and national representative, playing four Tests for Australia in 1973.

Playing career

St. George
Maddison started his first-grade football career  with St. George in 1965 and the following year appeared in his first grand final, the last of the Dragons' record-breaking 11 consecutive premiership wins. He won that first premiership as a  but later moved into the forwards and enjoyed success in his career as a wide running second-rower.

In the late 1960s after St George had lost the stars of their long reign, Ken Maddison's work ethic (along with the stellar brilliance of Billy Smith and Graeme Langlands) was a factor in keeping the club competitive, regularly finishing in the top five. Maddison played in the 1971 Grand Final loss to South Sydney, again in the centres. Ken's younger brother Keith Maddison also played alongside him at the Dragons in six seasons from 1966 to 1971.

Cronulla-Sutherland

1973 was Maddison's career high-point when he became the first forward to win the Rothmans Medal for best and fairest player in the League, edging out Ron Coote by just one point. He also scored a personal best eight tries that year before playing in Cronulla's first Grand Final, the 1973 loss to Manly-Warringah 7 - 10.

Although Maddison played at a time when the loose forwards of the Souths' pack - Coote, Bob McCarthy, Gary Stevens and Paul Sait - dominated representative selections, he managed his Australian debut at the end of a great club season in 1973 when he was selected for the 1973 Kangaroo tour of Great Britain and France. He was one of the form forwards of the tour scoring two tries in the third and deciding Test against Great Britain. He played in all three Ashes Tests, in one Test against France and in nine minor tour matches scoring six tries in all. The following year he made his sole state appearance for New South Wales Blues.

Maddison continued playing for Cronulla-Sutherland until 1975. In 2006, he was named at second-row in a Sharks dream team.

References

External links
Ken Maddison at nrlstats.com
Kangaroos beat Lions at Wilderspool

1946 births
Australian rugby league players
St. George Dragons players
Cronulla-Sutherland Sharks players
Western Suburbs Rosellas players
New South Wales rugby league team players
Australia national rugby league team players
Living people
Rugby league second-rows
Date of birth missing (living people)